The International Mother Language Award is a civilian award of Bangladesh. This award was created in 2021 to recognize special contributions to mother languages worldwide. The award is given every two years for contributions to the practice and preservation of mother tongues at the national and international level.

History

This award was launched by the Government of Bangladesh in celebration of Mujib Year, the birth ceremony of the first president of Bangladesh, Sheikh Mujibur Rahman. This award was launched under the Ministry of Education of Bangladesh

On International Mother Language Day, this award is given by the International Mother Language Institute. This award was given to two international and two Bangladeshi recipients: Muhammad Rafiq and Mathura Bikash Tripura from Bangladesh, Ismailov Gulam Mirzayevich from Uzbekistan and Activismo Lenguas from Bolivia.

Award Winners

Year 2021

 Mohammad Rafiqul Islam - Bangladesh
 Mathura Bikash Tripura - Bangladesh
 Islaimov Gulom Mirzaevich - Uzbekistan
 The Activismo Lenguas or Language Activism of Bolivia -Bolivia

References

Civil awards and decorations of Bangladesh
Awards established in 2021
2021 establishments in Bangladesh